Harm J. de Blij (see IJ (digraph); closest pronunciation: "duh blay") (1935–2014)  was a geographer. He was a geography editor on ABC's Good Morning America and an editor of National Geographic magazine and the author of several books, including Why Geography Matters.

De Blij received his early schooling in Europe, his college education in Africa, and his higher degrees in the United States (Ph.D. Northwestern, 1959). He published more than 30 books and over 100 articles and has received five honorary degrees. Several of his books have been translated into foreign languages. He was the editor of Oxford's Atlas of North America. A native of the Netherlands, he was a professor of geography and viticulture at Michigan State University and the University of Miami and a visiting professor at the Colorado School of Mines.

Dr. de Blij was a Distinguished Professor of Geography at Michigan State University. He held the George Landegger Chair in Georgetown University's school of Foreign Service and the John Deaver Drinko chair of geography at Marshall University; he also taught at the Colorado School of Mines and the University of Miami.

Recognitions
 Ellen Churchill Semple award, Department of Geography, University of Kentucky, 1989

Bibliography
 Mombasa: An African City, Northwestern University Press, 1968.
 Systematic Political Geography, John Wiley & Sons, 1973
 Essentials of Geography:  Regions and Concepts, John Wiley & Sons, 1974.
 Geography of Viticulture, Miami Geographical Society, 1981.
 Harm De Blij's Geography Book: A Leading Geographer's Fresh Look at Our Changing World, John Wiley & Sons, 1995.
 Why Geography Matters: Three Challenges Facing America, Oxford Univ. Press, 2005.
 Wartime Encounter, Hudson River Enterprises, 2006.
 Human Geography: People, Place, and Culture, John Wiley and Sons, Inc.
 The Power of Place: Geography, Destiny, and Globalization's Rough Landscape, Oxford Univ. Press, 2008.
 Realms, Regions and Concepts: With College Atlas of the World, John Wiley & Sons, Inc.

References

1935 births
2014 deaths
American geographers
Dutch geographers
Dutch emigrants to the United States
Colorado School of Mines faculty
Michigan State University faculty
Northwestern University alumni
People from Schiedam
University of Miami faculty